' Bustanak    is a village in Khwahan Badakhshan Province in north-eastern Afghanistan.

Bostanak is a small rural village which is located in a side of mountainous region and a gate way village to Jerw ab creek. The distance from Khawahan center to the village takes about 6 Hours walk to climb rocky mountain.
The people of Bostanak is reliable on remittance which they received from their relatives that they are migrated to other province either out of country. there is about 9 months winter season and heavy snow fall. During winter season the people are locked cannot move to district center. the local community doesn't have access to any kind of services such as, road, transport, electricity, medical services, hospital (Clinic) and safe drinking water.

References 

Populated places in Khwahan District